Speed Racer: The Next Generation is an animated television series based on the classic Japanese Speed Racer franchise, in which the internal events take place decades after those in the 1967 Japanese series. It is the fourth television adaptation of the franchise, and is executive produced by Lions Gate Entertainment, Larry Schwarz, and Ken Katsumoto. Animation Collective produced the series, while the Flash character animation was handled by the now-defunct Collideascope Studios as their last project. It aired on Nicktoons in the United States. The last episode of Season 1 features the voice of NASCAR racer Jeff Gordon, who plays Turbo McCalister.

This series was partly made to promote the live-action film, and the pilot movie premiered on Nicktoons on May 2, 2008, a week before the feature film adaptation was released in theatres. However, both projects were produced independently from one another and featured different generations of "Speed Racers" (with the film featuring the original generation), though both featured a Mach 6. Five three-part specials aired on Nickelodeon from March 14, 2009 to April 11, 2009.

Premise
Prior to the events of the series, the original Speed Racer has disappeared to protect his family, but the main characters know that he is alive. Initially only one of the original characters, Spritle, has a major role in this show. Speed Racer is seen briefly at the end of The Note and more recently in Plot for Teacher, and he makes a full appearance in the first episode of Season 2. Another member of the original cast appears at the end of Season 1, Speed Sr.'s original mechanic and friend Sparky, who shows up as an adult posing as a Russian engineer named Chezko (he assumed a false identity to protect himself from Speed's enemies). In the three-part story The Secrets of the Engine, "Dr. Chezko" (Sparky) helps finally perfect the engine of the Mach 6, allowing it to run without gasoline. The rest of the original cast are so far unseen, and their whereabouts currently unknown.

Given the apparent age of Speed Sr., Spritle, and Sparky, it is likely that Mom and Pops Racer, as well as Spritle's living chimpanzee pet Chim-Chim, are likely deceased by the time of the series. Speed Sr.'s girlfriend Trixie is revealed as the mother of Speed Jr. and X, but she plays a radically different role, instead serving as one of the main antagonists of the series.

The series follows the adventures of an orphan teenager named Speed who dreams of being a famed car racer like the one he is named after. He takes a bus to the elite Racing Academy, founded by the Racer family, and soon experiences the difficulties of fitting in and competing with X, the best racer/student in the school, and Speed Racer's son. Spritle himself is now the headmaster. In the pilot movie, Speed discovers that he is the other son of Speed Racer, meaning that X is his brother.

Through the rest of the series, Speed and his new allies set out on a quest to get through the courses, discover the mystery of Speed Racer's disappearance, and try and build the Mach Six, a car that captures the spirit and gadgets of the Mach Five for new generations, and the first car to contain a gasless engine. It is this Eco-friendly design that garners the attention of the oil tycoon Zile Zazic, who wants to destroy the car. It becomes apparent in Season 2 that the Mach 6 also possesses the power to travel through time, which becomes the primary focus for the remainder of the series as the series villains desire to use it for their own gains.

Another major plot device is the Virtual Track, a race track that transports racers to virtual racing environments known as the Virtual World. School faculty have the ability to add as many of their own obstacles as they wish, complying to school safety regulations. Whenever a racer is defeated in the track, they are automatically dispensed into the real world unharmed. However, like all programs, the virtual track can be infected with viruses or hacked, causing anyone trapped in the Virtual World to be affected.

Characters

Mach Five and Mach Six
The second episode features the rebuilt Mach 5 designed as it appeared in the original anime, only animated in CGI, like all of the other cars in the show's racing sequences. Minor changes have occurred in the Mach Five in this series. Although the function for the homing robot is present, it is redesigned to resemble more of a metal peacock than a sleek, futuristic robot dove. The Deflector is used as the roof of the Mach Five. Also revealed in this show is an ejector's seat underneath the driver's seat in case of emergencies. A parachute was made, but was forgotten to be installed at the time.

Its return is brief, as Zile Zazic destroys it successfully - the original makes a cameo in Plot for Teacher. However, plans for a new car are discovered and soon the protagonists rebuild the Mach Five to form the Mach 6. The Mach 6's engine is not designed to run on gas, which is a crucial story point, even though gas is still used for it through most of the series. It has all the features of the Mach Five, but redesigned or changed in some form or another. For example, the rotary saws are kept, but they've turned into laser saws. Also, the car has become more of a silver color with a fan in front and also includes two functional jets in the back where the fans were, and are used to get out of situations like a tornado ( as seen in the episode 'The Dance') or to help with acceleration. The new car features a transparent, holographic screen (better known as the 'comp') over the dashboard that the driver can use to interact live with his crew, and with other racers. Apparently, Speed mentions it can dispense rubber spiders out the back, and also real spiders, but he has not confirmed this. In recent episodes in Season 2, a new Mach 6 feature has been revealed after the completion of the gasless engine. When the Mach 6 gets up to the speed of 250 mph, an electrical charge causes the car to jump to another location in a matter of seconds. However, this feature can only be used three times before the car can be restarted. It has also been hinted that the Mach 6 has the ability to time travel with the right part for the gasless engine.

The Mach 6 succeeds the Mach 5 for the rest of the series, and more of the original gadgets were gradually revealed (such as the sludge slick) and used in future episodes.

Comic book miniseries
Speed Racer: The Next Generation Birthright was a four-issue miniseries published by IDW Publishing. It ran from November 2008 to February 2009.

Episodes

References

External links
 
 
 Speed Racer Deals Cross Finish Line
 NYCC 08: Speed Racer's Next Generation Revealed
 TV Guide's Speed Racer: The Next Generation episodes

Speed Racer
Animated television series reboots
2000s American animated television series
2010s American animated television series
2008 American television series debuts
2013 American television series endings
American children's animated action television series
American children's animated adventure television series
American children's animated sports television series
American flash animated television series
American sequel television series
Anime-influenced Western animated television series
Animated television series about orphans
Animated television series about auto racing
American television series based on Japanese television series
Indian children's animated action television series
Indian children's animated adventure television series
Irish children's animated action television series
Irish children's animated adventure television series
Television series by Lionsgate Television
Nicktoons (TV network) original programming
English-language television shows